The Newport River is a tributary of the North Eaton River whose current flows successively into the Eaton River, Saint-François River, then the Saint Lawrence River.

The Newport River flows through the municipalities of Newport and Cookshire-Eaton in the Le Haut-Saint-François Regional County Municipality (MRC), in the administrative region of Estrie, in Quebec, in Canada.

Geography 

The adjacent hydrographic slopes of the Newport River are:
 north side: Bury brook, Tambs brook, Brookbury brook, Saint-François River, Ditton West brook;
 east side: Sherman stream, Statton stream, rivière aux Saumons;
 south side: North Eaton River;
 west side: Pope stream, Eaton River.

The Newport River originates in the municipality of Bury, south of the village of Bury and north of the locality of Learned Plain.

  southwesterly, to the municipal boundary between Newport and Cookshire-Eaton;
  southwest, to Learned Plain Road;
  southwest, to route 212;
  towards the south, until its mouth.

Toponymy 

The toponym "Newport River" was formalized on December 5, 1968, at the Commission de toponymie du Québec.

See also 
 St. Lawrence River
 List of rivers of Quebec

References 

Le Haut-Saint-François Regional County Municipality
Rivers of Estrie